Studio 54 is a Broadway theater and a former disco nightclub at 254 West 54th Street in the Midtown Manhattan neighborhood of New York City. Operated by the Roundabout Theatre Company, Studio 54 has 1,006 seats on two levels. The theater was designed by Eugene De Rosa for producer Fortune Gallo and opened in 1927 as the Gallo Opera House. The current Broadway theater is named after a nightclub on the same site, founded by Steve Rubell and Ian Schrager, which operated within the theater's space in the late 1970s and the 1980s. 

Plans for the Gallo Opera House announced in 1926, and it opened on November 8, 1927, as a legitimate theater and opera house for the San Carlo Grand Opera Company. The theater went bankrupt within two years and was renamed the New Yorker Theatre in 1930. The Casino de Paree nightclub operated at the theater from December 1933 to April 1935, and the theater briefly hosted the Palladium Music Hall in early 1936. The Federal Music Project took over the theater in 1937 and presented shows there for three years. CBS began using the theater as a soundstage called Radio Playhouse No. 4 in 1942; when television broadcasts began in 1949, the theater was renamed Studio 52.

Schrager and Rubell took over the venue in 1976, retaining much of the former theatrical and broadcasting equipment while turning it into a nightclub. The club opened on April 26, 1977, at the peak of the disco dancing and music trend and quickly became popular. The original iteration of Studio 54 was noted for its celebrity guest lists, restrictive and subjective entry policies, extravagant events, rampant club drug use, and open sexual activity. Schrager and Rubell's club was short-lived and controversial, and it closed in early 1980 after the men were convicted of tax evasion. Mark Fleischman operated a scaled-down version of the nightclub from 1981 to 1986, after which it continued to operate under new management for three more years. Studio 54's space housed the Ritz rock club from 1989 to 1993, then the Cabaret Royale bar from 1994 to 1996.

The Roundabout Theatre Company renovated the theater in 1998, relocating its production of the musical Cabaret to Studio 54 that November following a construction accident. Cabaret closed at the beginning of 2004; since then, the theater has generally hosted two productions per season. A separate restaurant and nightclub, 54 Below, has operated in the theater's basement since 2012, while a cabaret named Upstairs at 54 is located on the second floor. Although the first iteration of the Studio 54 nightclub was short-lived, it inspired the creation of a record label, a radio station, and several similar nightclubs. The original club has been featured in several exhibitions, films, and music albums, and memorabilia from the club have been sold for thousands of dollars.

Design 
Studio 54 was originally designed by Eugene De Rosa as the Gallo Opera House, which contained 1,400 seats when it opened in 1927. De Rosa's original plans called for lounges, restrooms, and promenades on three stories, as well as an opera museum below the primary floors. By 1933, when it was being used as the Casino de Paree nightclub, the theater had 650 seats on the orchestra level and 500 seats in the balcony. CBS documents show that, when the theater was used as CBS Studio 52 in the mid-20th century, it had 828 seats on three levels: 312 in the orchestra, 371 in the balcony, and 145 in a mezzanine. The modern-day theater has 1,006 seats across two levels: 519 in the orchestra and 487 in the balcony. The theater contained nightclub tables during the late 20th century, which were removed in 1998 after Studio 54's re-conversion into a theater and replaced with raked seating.

Ida Louise Killam designed the original interior with a gold, blue, and rose palette. One early observer described the theater as having "a Roxy foyer and a Paramount promenade". The orchestra seats were originally divided by five aisles. The orchestra-level walls were clad with walnut, and the trimmings at balcony level and in the mezzanine lounge were also made of walnut. This dome is decorated with medallions. Backstage were six dressing rooms, as well as a  rehearsal space at stage left.

To avoid disrupting the construction of the New York City Subway's Eighth Avenue Line, structural engineer David M. Oltarsh placed the Gallo Opera House's foundation, orchestra, and balcony within an enclosure that was suspended from the theater building's roof. The modern mezzanine-level promenade has an exhibit with information on the theater's current production. The theater also contains a bar in its lobby, which is a tribute to the former Studio 54 nightclub.

54 Below 

The cabaret club 54 Below opened in Studio 54's basement on June 5, 2012. It was designed by architect Richard H. Lewis, set designer John Lee Beatty, lighting designer Ken Billington, and sound designer Peter Hylenski. A staircase from ground level leads to a rectangular room with leather and wood decorations, as well as a red, purple, and brown color palette. The room contains 140 seats in a cabaret-style arrangement and 16 seats in a bar to the right. Originally, 54 Below presented shows every day of the week, with 4,000 performances in its first five years. In partnership with musician Michael Feinstein, the club was renamed Feinstein's/54 Below in 2015; the club reverted to the name 54 Below when the partnership ended in July 2022.

Upstairs at Studio 54
Josh Hadar of Allied Partners created a 175-seat cabaret space on the second floor, called Upstairs at Studio 54. The space opened in February 2001 and is accessed via its own entrance at ground level. This space was used exclusively for special events. Performances occurred during nights when plays were not being staged. The musical Newsical was staged there from October 2004 to April 2005.

Early history

Gallo Opera House 
In July 1926, theatrical impresario Fortune Gallo leased a site at 254 West 54th Street and hired Eugene De Rosa to design a 16-story office building at the site, with a 1,400-seat theater at its base. Z. D. Berry and Robert Podgur would build the venue at an estimated cost of $2 million. Gallo planned to present the San Carlo Grand Opera Company's productions at the theater during the autumn, renting it out for legitimate shows at other times. The venue was originally supposed to open in January 1927, but this was delayed because the opera company had an extended engagement in San Francisco. Prior to the venue's opening, Gallo transferred his interest in the San Carlo Company to his nephew Aurelio Gallo, allowing the elder Gallo to focus on operating the new theater.

The opera house opened on November 8, 1927, with the San Carlo Company's large-scale production of La bohème. The Gallo was one of three legitimate theaters to open in New York City during 1927; at the time, the city had over 200 legitimate theaters. The San Carlo Company performed for two weeks. A revival of the play Electra opened at the Gallo that December, followed the same month by Juno and the Paycock. A $660,000 mortgage was placed on the theater building in January 1928. The American Opera Company opened its season there the same month, performing there until March. Ballet Moderne also performed there for two weeks in April 1928.

Philip Goodman leased the theater for five years in mid-1928. Goodman used the theater to stage a production of Laurence Stallings and Oscar Hammerstein II's musical Rainbow, which ran for less than a month in late 1928. In the meantime, the theater also hosted events such as dance performances, a violin recital, and a choir performance. Radiant Productions leased the theater in September 1929, with plans to present a dozen plays for three weeks each. Their first and only production, Ladies Don't Lie, was a critical failure. That October, Radiant transferred its lease to William R. Kane, who staged a short-lived revival of the comedy A Tailor-Made Man there. At a foreclosure auction in December 1929, the theater's mortgagee Hemphill Realty Corporation bought the theater for $1,045,000.

New Yorker Theatre 
Gallo sold his lease to an unidentified buyer in January 1930, as he wanted to focus on operating a radio station. Richard Herndon took over as the theater's managing director, renaming it the New Yorker Theatre the next month. The first production at the renamed theater was the Henrik Ibsen play The Vikings, which had a short run in May 1930. The New Yorker hosted more dance recitals before the opening of its next legitimate show, Electra, in December 1930. Oliver D. Bailey signed a five-year lease for the theater in January 1931. In general, the theater suffered from low attendance during the Great Depression. Among the theater's productions in 1931 were the plays Gray Shadow, Young Sinners, Ebb Tide, and It Never Rains; the musical Fast and Furious; and performances by the New Yorker Grand Opera Company. The next year, the theater hosted several plays performed by the Spanish-speaking theatrical company La Compania Dramatic Espanola, as well as another dance festival. The Bowery Savings Bank bought the New Yorker and the adjacent office building for $650,000 in December 1932.

The bank leased the theater to Continental Music Halls Inc. for five years in September 1933. Continental announced plans to convert the theater into a nightclub called Casino de Paree (sometimes spelled Casino de Paris), with dining areas on two stories and a kitchen in the basement. The club's operators spent $200,000 on renovations, reopening the venue on December 12, 1933. It was one of three theaters near 54th Street that were converted to nightclubs in the mid-1930s. There were 1,150 seats on two levels. The stage was used as a dance floor, accessed by steps from the orchestra level, and was flanked by two bands. Billy Rose organized two shows a night, for which guests paid $1.50 to $2 per ticket. According to Variety, the nightclub "just about satisfies the gastronomic, bibulous, and entertainment needs of any mortal".

The club's operators bought the theater and adjacent office building in March 1934. The club's cheap revues competed with Broadway musicals with higher-priced tickets. Rose withdrew from the venture in September 1934 because of disagreements over pay. The Casino de Paree was closed for renovations in February 1935, reopening two weeks later. The Casino de Paree abruptly closed after filing for bankruptcy in April 1935. That December, the Bowery Savings Bank leased the theater to the Palladium Operating Corporation, which planned to convert it into an "English"-style music hall. The Palladium Music Hall opened the next month; it was to host a new show every two weeks, with two bands performing during dinnertime. The Palladium had trouble paying wages within three weeks of its opening, and it closed permanently at the beginning of February 1936.

The Works Progress Administration (WPA)'s Federal Music Project leased the theater, as well as four of the office floors, in November 1936; the venue would host operas and concerts by the WPA's Theatre of Music. The WPA renovated the theater over the next two months, opening the Theater of Music on January 24, 1937. The WPA renewed its lease later the same year. An all-black WPA cast from Chicago presented The Swing Mikado at the New Yorker Theatre in early 1939; after two months, the production moved to the 44th Street Theatre. The play Medicine Show then premiered at the New Yorker in April 1940, closing after a month. This was the theater's last Broadway show for nearly six decades.

Use as studio 
The Bowery Savings Bank again owned the New Yorker Theatre by late 1940, and the bank's real-estate agent Joseph O'Gara was looking to lease the venue. That October, RCA Manufacturing signed a one-year lease for the theater, exhibiting television projectors there. RCA subsidiary NBC installed a  television screen by the end of 1940. Early the following year, NBC installed a  projection screen on the stage, spending $25,000 to $30,000 on the project. The first public exhibition of the theater's screen was in May 1941, when over a thousand audience members watched a live broadcast of a boxing match between Billy Soose and Ken Overlin at Madison Square Garden. In September 1941, the Top Dollar Theatre company unsuccessfully tried to lease the venue from the Bowery Savings Bank. The New Yorker Theatre then briefly hosted the children's play The Adventures of Marco Polo at the end of that December.

CBS Studio 52 
The Columbia Broadcasting System (CBS) leased the New Yorker Theatre in August 1942 for use as a radio soundstage. For three decades, the theater operated as a radio and television studio. Originally, the theater was known as Radio Playhouse No. 4 or Theater No. 4. The onetime New Yorker Theatre was converted for television in 1949, and it became CBS-TV Studio 52. Shielded television cameras had to be developed due to strong magnetic interference from equipment at a neighboring power substation for the New York City Subway system. The studio was one of seven that CBS operated in New York City. At that time, several Broadway theaters had been converted to TV studios due to a lack of studio space in the city.

Likely the first television show to be produced at Studio 52, was The 54th Street Revue, which premiered in May 1949. Another early show produced at Studio 52 was The Fred Waring Show in 1950. Studio 52 and the neighboring Studio 50 (now the Ed Sullivan Theater) were among CBS's busiest stages by the early 1960s. The theater hosted such shows as What's My Line?, The $64,000 Question, Video Village, Password, To Tell the Truth, Beat the Clock, The Jack Benny Show, I've Got a Secret, Ted Mack and the Original Amateur Hour, and Captain Kangaroo. Studio 52 was used to tape many of the CBS shows that involved panel discussions. Members of the public could also buy tickets to view these tapings. The New York Times said in 1965 that many of the regular audience members were older women. The soap opera Love of Life was produced at Studio 52 until 1975 and was the last show to be taped there. CBS moved most of its broadcast operations out of Studio 52 in 1976 and placed the theater up for sale.

Nightclub era

Inception and opening 
By 1976, German-born male model Uva Harden was planning to open a nightclub in New York City, which he tentatively called "Studio". Harden and Israeli entrepreneur Yoram Polany agreed to take over the old CBS Studio 52 that year. Polany and another friend of Harden's independently recommended that the nightclub be called "Studio 54" because it was on 54th Street. Harden and Polany formed a corporation to operate the nightclub, but they struggled to obtain a liquor license from the New York State Liquor Authority (NYSLA). They hired , who had hosted monthly parties at Maurice Brahms's Infinity nightclub, as the club's publicist.  To finance the nightclub, the operators of the Marlborough Gallery bought nearly all of the stock in Harden and Polany's corporation in November 1976. At the time, the gallery's owner Frank Lloyd had just been ordered to pay $9 million to artist Mark Rothko's estate in the Rothko case.

After continued delays, Harden met with entrepreneurs Steve Rubell and Ian Schrager, who agreed to partner with him in the nightclub's operation. Harden was eventually forced out of the club's operation, while Polany left on his own volition. In November 1976, Billboard magazine reported that Schrager and Rubell planned to convert the theater into a nightclub called Studio 54. It would be one of several discotheques to operate in Midtown Manhattan during the late 1970s. Rubell and Schrager formed the Broadway Catering Corp., which spent $400,000 to transform the theater into a nightclub. Rubell, Schrager, and Jack Dushey each owned a one-third stake in the venture, and they had hired several people to create the club by early 1977. These included architect Scott Bromley, interior designer Ron Doud, lighting designer Brian Thompson, and set designer Richie Williamson. Lighting designers Jules Fisher and Paul Marantz were hired to design the dance floor and rigging system. Rubell and Schrager retained D'Alessio to promote Studio 54.

The renovation involved the construction of a dance floor, a balcony, and a disco booth, as well as the addition of mirrors, light bars, and floating vinyl platforms. The orchestra seated 250 people, and the balcony had another 500 seats. The lighting system, which required three people to operate, included a dozen  poles with flashing lights. Fisher and Marantz adapted the existing rigging system to generate special effects such as confetti, snow, fog, and weather. On the ceiling was a  cyclorama, which could project images of many different galaxies. Other decorations included depictions of volcanos, sunrises, and sunsets. Aero Graphics designed a backlit moon and spoon, which became an icon of the Studio 54 nightclub. The club's promoters mailed out 8,000 invitations and made phone calls to numerous figures on "a good social list". Studio 54 officially opened on April 26, 1977, with workers rushing to finish the decorations just hours before the grand opening. Although the space could fit 2,500 guests, four thousand people attended the club on opening day. Hundreds of prospective patrons lined up around the block to enter, and several celebrities could not get in, despite having been invited.

The scene
Studio 54 had been launched at the peak of the disco dancing and music trend. Its popularity grew rapidly, especially after the publication of a widely-circulated picture that showed actress Bianca Jagger at the club, riding a white horse. In the month after its opening, the club served an average of 2,000 guests per night, although it was only open on Tuesdays through Saturdays. By August 1977, the club had become so successful that Rubell and Schrager were considering opening similar nightclubs in Los Angeles and London. Rubell ultimately chose not to open similar clubs around the world, saying: "I'm very cautious about protecting the name and not cheapening it." In November 1977, Dan Dorfman of New York magazine quoted Rubell as saying that "only the Mafia made more money" than Studio 54, which made $7 million in its first year.

Upon Studio 54's first anniversary in April 1978, which attracted 3,000 guests, Rubell said the club's popularity contradicted sentiments that the club "wouldn't last more than a couple of months". That October, Rubell and Schrager closed the club for nine days, spending $500,000 on renovations. The work included adding spotlights and mirrored walls, as well as a movable bridge.

Admission policy 
To be admitted to Studio 54 was a status symbol, even on nights when the club was open to the public. When Studio 54 opened, admission generally cost $7 or $8, but guests could pay for an annual membership in exchange for discounted tickets. Tickets were more expensive on weekends, and all ticket prices were increased on nights with performances. Rubell made the final decisions over whether guests were allowed in the club. Celebrities usually were allowed to enter immediately. According to a 1977 Wall Street Journal article, "very beautiful" members of the public were almost always admitted, while men entering alone were invariably rejected to prevent predatory behavior. Guests were divided into four categories, ranging from the "No Goods" (who could never be admitted) to the "No Fuck-ups" (important clients who were admitted instantly). Rubell bragged about the club's exclusivity, saying in a November 1977 interview with New York magazine: "I turned away 1,400 people last Saturday."

The club's doormen could be extremely selective, sometimes to the point that "they propelled themselves into a comedy universe" according to Haden-Guest. Rubell once told a "ravishingly beautiful woman" that she could enter for free if she took off all her clothes; the woman was later hospitalized for frostbitten nipples. The selective admissions policies led some guests to bypass the front door in an attempt to enter. According to Haden-Guest, one potential guest got stuck in a ventilation shaft and died, an account that Schrager later confirmed. Some of Studio 54's spurned clientele fled to other clubs such as New York, New York. When the club was renovated in 1978, Rubell and Schrager sealed its courtyard to prevent people from entering there. There was also a private entrance on 53rd Street, reflecting the "stratification" of the nightclub.

On several occasions, would-be guests attacked the doormen after being denied admission, and several guests pulled out guns when they were rejected. The club's security guards often cleared out trash cans within a several-block radius because of high concerns over violence. Some notables were denied admission. For instance, the president of Cyprus was once rejected because the doormen thought he was the president of New York City's Cypress Hills Cemetery. When one of Saudi king Khalid's sons was rejected, the Saudi embassy to the United States wrote Rubell a letter, asking that Khalid's son not be rejected again. The band Chic wrote a song in 1978, "Le Freak", after being refused entry to the club on New Year's Eve 1977, despite having been invited by Grace Jones. Even club members were not guaranteed entry. In June 1978, the New York City Department of Consumer Affairs (DCA) mandated that Rubell and Schrager stop selling memberships and refund existing members. The club failed to refund all memberships immediately, and Schrager claimed that November that only 40 members had applied for refunds.

Inside the club 
The club generally opened at 10 p.m., with crowds peaking at midnight; the bar closed at 4 a.m., and the rest of the club stayed open until 6 a.m.. According to Rubell, the vast majority of the club's guests were not celebrities but, rather, members of the public who just wanted to dance. The Washington Post wrote in November 1977 that the club attracted "a mix of punks, hairdressers, socialites, and suburbanites", while The New York Times said the club was "tolerant of errant squares". Andy Warhol, a regular guest of Studio 54, said the club was "a dictatorship on the door but a democracy on the dance floor". Studio 54 enforced a photography ban to protect guests' privacy, but some images were still published, including a widely circulated image of Canadian first lady Margaret Trudeau without her underwear.

Many guests used club drugs, and they often engaged in open sexual activity on the club's balcony and in private basement rooms. The Journal characterized most of the women guests as "beneficiaries of a fabulously lucky genetic selection" and that the men guests generally had an "aura of self-esteem born in the knowledge that one can successfully choose among the select".  Celebrity appearances, which were almost guaranteed, were frequently showcased in New York City's daily newspapers and in gossip columns. The nightclub was also frequented by many gay celebrities, leading Anthony Haden-Guest wrote that the club became "one of the single most effective showcases for newly visible gay clout". By 1978, there was a private dance floor behind a movable scrim on the main dance floor, as well as a VIP room in the basement, which could only be accessed by a hidden stairway.

The club also hosted private parties that, at a minimum, cost tens of thousands of dollars. The invitations to the parties were extravagant, using such materials as "Cupid's arrows, inflatable hearts, [or] jars of confetti". Among the events at Studio 54 was a New Year's Eve party hosted by event planner Robert Isabell, who dumped four tons of glitter onto the floor, creating a four-inch layer that could be found in attendees' clothing and homes several months later. The organizers of a Valentine's Day party in 1979 imported 3,000 Dutch tulips, transported  of sod from Bermuda, and rented eight antique sculptures that each cost $17,000. Other events at the club included fundraisers for local politicians, as well as a Halloween party hosted by the staff of People magazine. Studio 54 was also a filming location for several music videos, such as those for several songs in Musique's album Keep On Jumpin'.

Notable patrons 

 Bella Abzug
 Woody Allen
 Mikhail Baryshnikov
 John Belushi
 Leonard Bernstein
 Jacqueline Bisset
 David Bowie
 Truman Capote
 Gia Carangi
 Allan Carr
 Cher
 Pat Cleveland
 Roy Cohn
 Salvador Dalí
 Divine
 Faye Dunaway
 Doris Duke
 Farrah Fawcett
 Ric Flair
 Betty Ford
 Tom Ford
 Diane von Fürstenberg
 Richard Gallo
 David Geffen
 Martha Graham
 Richard Gere
 Jerry Hall
 Halston
 Victor Hugo
 Anjelica Huston
 Debbie Harry
 Margaux Hemingway
 Tommy Hilfiger
 Lauren Hutton
 Michael Jackson
 Bianca Jagger
 Mick Jagger
 Rick James
 Bruce Jenner
 Elton John
 Grace Jones
 Tom Jones
 Jacqueline Kennedy Onassis
 Eartha Kitt
 Calvin Klein
 Karl Lagerfeld
 Timothy Leary
 Fran Lebowitz
 John Lennon
 Lorna Luft
 George Michael
 Bette Midler
 Liza Minnelli
 Freddie Mercury
 Jack Nicholson
 Al Pacino
 Dolly Parton
 Paloma Picasso
 Richard Pryor
 Gilda Radner
 Lou Reed
 Geraldo Rivera
 Diana Ross
 Brooke Shields
 Frank Sinatra
 Sylvester Stallone
 Paul Stanley
 Percy Sutton
 Tallulah
 Elizabeth Taylor
 John Travolta
 Margaret Trudeau
 Donald and Ivana Trump
 Tina Turner
 Valentino
 Diana Vreeland
 Andy Warhol
 Robin Williams

Other notables at the club 
 Actor Al Corley was a doorman during the late 1970s.
 Actor Alec Baldwin worked for two months as a waiter at Studio 54.
 Sally Lippman, also known as "Disco Sally", was a 77-year-old widow and regular dancer at the club.
 Carolina Somoza, daughter of Nicaraguan president Anastasio Somoza Debayle

Downfall

License issues and other disputes 
Schrager did not have a liquor license when the club opened, despite having applied to the NYSLA for such a license. Instead, the nightclub applied for a "caterers' permit" every day; these permits were intended for weddings or political events, but they technically allowed the venue to serve alcohol. The club also did not have a certificate of occupancy or a public assembly license, prompting tipsters to complain to several federal agencies. On May 21, 1977, the NYSLA raided the nightclub for selling liquor without a license. The club reopened the next night, serving fruit juice and soda instead of liquor. Studio 54 continued serving non-alcoholic drinks exclusively until a justice for the New York Supreme Court, the state's trial-level court, ordered the NYSLA to grant Studio 54 a liquor license that October. The NYSLA's chairman complied with the Supreme Court ruling but objected to it, claiming that the judge had been influenced by Studio 54's upscale clientele. The New York Court of Appeals upheld the Supreme Court's decision in June 1978.

Schrager also applied for a cabaret license from the DCA, which did not grant Studio 54 a permanent cabaret license for more than a year. A contributing factor was that the city government only employed three cabaret inspectors, who could not validate all of the city's cabaret licenses in a timely manner. Additionally, the DCA rarely fined unlicensed cabarets more than $25. At the beginning of June 1978, DCA officials said the cabaret application had not been approved because of multiple violations of fire codes, though the New York City Fire Department refused to provide further details about these violations. The DCA could also deny a permanent license because of unresolved consumer complaints, such as those concerning Studio 54's annual memberships. The DCA refused to renew Studio 54's temporary cabaret license in August 1978 because Schrager and Rubell had not refunded all of the memberships.

Also in August 1978, the American Society of Composers, Authors and Publishers (ASCAP) sued Rubell and Schrager, alleging that the co-owners had failed to pay licensing fees for six performances that ASCAP had staged at Studio 54 earlier that year. Studio 54 ultimately paid ASCAP for a license in November 1978. The National Labor Relations Board was also investigating the club by February 1979 after some workers alleged that the club had engaged in "unfair labor practices".

End of the first era 

In December 1978, a tipster called the Internal Revenue Service (IRS), alleging that Rubell and Schrager were skimming profits. The tip came from a disgruntled ex-employee, who also alleged that cocaine was illegally being stored in the basement. Shortly after, IRS agents raided Studio 54 and arrested Rubell and Schrager. The club continued to operate the night of the raid. A federal grand jury indicted Rubell and Schrager on charges of tax evasion in June 1979, observing that the two men had skimmed $2.5 million, or as much as 60 percent of Studio 54's receipts over the past two years. In an unsuccessful attempt to lessen the charges against the club's co-owners, Schrager's lawyer Mitchell Rogovin alleged that Hamilton Jordan, chief of staff to U.S. president Jimmy Carter, had used cocaine in the club's basement. In anticipation of increasing interest in rock music, Rubell and Schrager spent $1.2 million to renovate Studio 54 in late 1979. They installed a grand chandelier and a fly system above the stage, as well as removing seats from the balcony.

Rubell and Schrager ultimately pleaded guilty to tax evasion in November 1979, after New York magazine published a cover story describing the "party favors" that the two men gave to their friends. In exchange, federal prosecutors agreed not to charge the men with obstruction of justice and conspiracy. By then, the club was in danger of losing its liquor license after the owners had pleaded guilty to tax evasion, as the NYSLA did not give liquor licenses to convicted felons. Rubell and Schrager were each sentenced to three and a half years in prison in January 1980. The two men attended a final party on the night of February 2–3, 1980, with Diana Ross and Liza Minnelli singing for numerous guests. Rubell and Schrager began serving their sentences two days afterward. Ultimately, Rubell and Schrager were paroled after a year, and Schrager received a presidential pardon decades later.

The NYSLA unanimously voted not to renew Studio 54's liquor license on February 28, 1980, citing Rubell's and Schrager's criminal convictions, although the club was allowed to continue operating. The club lost its liquor license on February 29, and the club started serving fruit punch the next day. Studio 54's lawyers also announced that they would create a board of directors to operate the club. The third co-owner, Jack Dushey, had received a $10,000 fine and had been sentenced to five years of unsupervised probation after being convicted of conspiracy charges in March 1980. By the end of that month, Rubell was considering selling the club, despite having promised just two months prior that he would never sell Studio 54. Among those who expressed interest in the club were restaurateur Mark Fleischman, television host Dick Clark, and record executive Neil Bogart. The club closed down at the end of that March, as the revocation of the liquor license had caused a sharp decrease in business. Early the next month,  Fleischman agreed to buy an option that would allow him to purchase the club for $5 million.

Fleischman and Weiss operation
After announcing his plan to take over Studio 54, Fleischman said he would host live shows there and obtain a liquor license from the NYSLA. Studio 54 remained shuttered through the rest of the year, in large part because Rubell and Schrager continued to file legal objections against the NYSLA's revocation of the club's liquor license. The authority would not issue a liquor license as long as the club was involved in active litigation. Mike Stone Productions leased the club from Rubell and Schrager in early 1981, and the club started hosting private events again, albeit without alcoholic drinks and only on Friday and Saturday nights. Rubell's company sold the building to Philip Pilevsky for $1.15 million in cash in August 1981, leasing back space from Pilevsky. Fleischman applied for a liquor license from the NYSLA, which agreed to grant the license on the condition that Rubell and Schrager not be involved in any way. Fleischman also repainted the interior and removed the original club's light fixtures, and he paid the New York state government $250,000 in back taxes.

Studio 54 officially reopened to the public on September 15, 1981. Fleischman and his partner Jeffrey London mailed out 12,000 invitations for Studio 54's reopening, which were delivered on 25-watt silver lightbulbs. Jim Fouratt and Rudolf Piper were hired as Studio 54's new managers. Initially, the club hosted "Modern Classix nights" during Wednesdays and Sundays, while it hosted disco music for the remainder of the week. There was also a 32-track recording studio in the basement, which was used for recording promotional videos and rock concerts. Notable figures associated with the second iteration of Studio 54 included doorman Haoui Montaug, as well as Paul Heyman, who was a photographer, producer, and promoter at the club. A notable guest during this time was Drew Barrymore, who was nine years old when her mother took her to Studio 54. Within three months of the club's reopening, Fleischman had ousted Fouratt and Piper, who opened the Danceteria nightclub.

In 1982, social activist Jerry Rubin started hosting "Business Networking Salons", a networking event for businesspeople, at the club on Wednesday nights. Prospective guests would only be admitted if they had a business card;  the networking events quickly became popular, often attracting 1,500 guests. For other events, Studio 54 implemented an invitation system, which enabled its operators to restrict some events to select guests without turning them away at the door. The club's mailing list had 200,000 names by 1984. Frank Cashman acquired the $3 million lien on the club in late 1984. The same year, Studio 54 also hosted special musical performances, starting with a series of concerts by Julie Budd. Meanwhile, the club was gradually losing long-time regulars to competing discotheques, including the Palladium, which Rubell and Schrager had opened after being released from prison. The club also faced several lawsuits from disgruntled high-profile guests, such as football player Mark Gastineau and a basketball player.

Fleischman filed for bankruptcy in November 1985; he had planned to spend $250,000 on renovations to attract guests. The club closed in April 1986 because it could not obtain liability insurance, in part because Studio 54 was losing so many of the lawsuits in which it was involved. Subsequently, Shalom Weiss took over Studio 54. The nightclub tended to attract a young and racially mixed clientele who were frequently involved in fights, prompting complaints from local residents. City officials revoked the club's cabaret license for two years in January 1989 after finding that the club's patrons frequently used cocaine illegally. The officials alleged that Studio 54 employees not only encouraged illegal drug use but also used cocaine themselves. In addition, the club admitted guests as young as 13 and had falsely advertised itself as selling alcoholic beverages.

The Ritz and Cabaret Royale 

Studio 54 was dilapidated by the late 1980s; the walls had peeling paint, while the auditorium's dome had been concealed by a dropped ceiling. Neil Cohen and John Scher, owners of the Ritz nightclub, leased the space from Philip Pilevsky for 25 years in 1989. They spent $2 million to restore the theater, adding fixed seating at orchestra level and installing production equipment above the stage. Cohen and Scher anticipated that the club could fit 3,000 people, including standees, although the theater only had about 1,800 seats. The Ritz relocated from the East Village to Studio 54 on April 5, 1989. According to The New York Times, the new Ritz was more popular than the old location because both the orchestra and balcony had "excellent sound and sightlines". The Ritz was primarily a rock club, but it also hosted performances of pop music and salsa music. The Ritz was one of the most active nightclubs in the United States, with about 150 shows annually, until its promoters started booking fewer shows in mid-1991. Despite declining profits in 1992, the club's owners were planning to add a 250-seat side room next to the auditorium.

CAT Entertainment acquired Scher's interest in the Ritz in December 1992, and CAT was itself acquired by Cabaret Royale Corporation the next year. In July 1993, the Ritz announced it would close down and reopen as a topless bar. CAT Entertainment spent $3 million renovating the theater, including the stage area. CAT also resurrected both the nightclub and the Studio 54 trademark, which had never been properly registered by any of the prior owners or operators. John Neilson took over the venue with plans to reopen it as an uptown location of the Stringfellows nightclub. The remodeled nightclub opened in January 1994 and was operated as "Cabaret Royale at Studio 54". Most of the old theater's architectural detail had been covered up by then.

Meanwhile, the Bank of Tokyo had previously granted a mortgage on the theater and the adjacent office building to Pilevsky, which it foreclosed upon in June 1994. Later that month, the theater and building were auctioned off. CBS, the Manhattan Theatre Club, and Viacom were among those that showed interest in acquiring the theater and building. Allied Partners, run by the Hadar family, ultimately acquired the properties for $5.5 million. Allied then renovated the office building. Cabaret Royale closed in January 1995, and Allied announced plans to convert the space into a virtual reality gaming venue at a cost of $10 million. In anticipation of Studio 54's conversion, the nightclub hosted a final party on May 23, 1996, featuring disco star Gloria Gaynor and performers such as Crystal Waters and RuPaul. The virtual-reality complex was never built because of a lack of demand, and the club's space was instead rented out for private events. Allied Partners preferred that the Studio 54 building become "anything but a nightclub".

Roundabout Theatre at Studio 54 

Since 1998, the nonprofit Roundabout Theatre Company has operated Studio 54 as a Broadway theater, branded as Roundabout Theatre at Studio 54. It is one of Roundabout's three Broadway theaters, the others being the American Airlines Theatre and the Stephen Sondheim Theatre.

Relocation and early productions 
In July 1998, the collapse of a construction hoist at 4 Times Square blocked access to the Henry Miller Theatre (now Stephen Sondheim Theatre) on 43rd Street, where the nonprofit Roundabout Theatre Company's successful revival of the Broadway musical Cabaret was playing. Roundabout quickly began searching for alternative venues and, in September 1998, decided to move the production to Studio 54. The old nightclub required extensive renovations and was not air-conditioned, but Roundabout's artistic director Todd Haimes considered it the "only viable option" for the theatre company. Cabaret producer Sam Mendes had considered Studio 54's dilapidated condition to be an ideal setting for the production, just as the Henry Miller had been. Roundabout spent over $1 million converting the former nightclub into a 950-seat theater, buying old seats from the Imperial Theatre and installing them in the mezzanine. Cabaret moved to Studio 54 in November 1998, doubling the production's capacity.

Richard Hadar announced in early 1999 that he would operate a nightclub within the theater, which would still host performances of Cabaret during the day. By 2001, Roundabout was negotiating to buy Studio 54 from the Hadar family, which would allow the theatre company to own a Broadway theater for the first time. Early the next year, the Hadar family agreed to sell the theater for around $25 million. To fund the purchase, Roundabout would receive up to $32 million in tax-exempt bonds and $9 million from the New York City Department of Cultural Affairs (DCA). Roundabout finalized its purchase in July 2003, paying $22.5 million, of which $6.75 million came from the DCA and $17.7 million came from tax-exempt bonds. Allied continued to own the office space above the theater.

2000s 
Roundabout planned to use Studio 54 to host larger productions that could not be staged at the American Airlines Theatre. Haimes also wanted to renovate the theater, including expanding the orchestra pit and replacing the rigging system. After Cabaret closed in January 2004, Roundabout staged several shows a year at both theaters, and Studio 54 hosted a mixture of musicals and plays. The Stephen Sondheim and John Weidman musical Assassins was Roundabout's first new production at Studio 54, opening in April 2004. A revival of another musical by the same team, Pacific Overtures, opened that December. Following these two productions, Broadway historian Louis Botto wrote that Studio 54 "had finally fully been welcomed into the Broadway family nearly 80 years after Fortune Gallo first dreamed of it".

Roundabout completed some renovations in 2005, which involved installing raked seating and an exhibit in the promenade. The theater hosted a revival of Tennessee Williams's A Streetcar Named Desire in April 2005. For the 2005–2006 season, Studio 54 staged Eugene O'Neill's A Touch of the Poet and Bertolt Brecht's The Threepenny Opera. The theater then hosted the plays The Apple Tree and 110 in the Shade in the 2006–2007 season; The Ritz and Sunday in the Park with George in the 2007–2008 season; and Pal Joey and Waiting for Godot in the 2008–2009 season. For the 2009–2010 season, the theater presented Carrie Fisher's solo performance Wishful Drinking, as well as and James Lapine and Stephen Sondheim's revue Sondheim on Sondheim.

2010s to present 
During the 2010–2011 season, Studio 54 hosted Brief Encounter (an adaptation of two Noël Coward works), as well as the musical The People in the Picture. Studio 54 was supposed to host a revival of Bob Fosse's musical Dancin' during the 2011–2012 season, but this was ultimately canceled, and the theater was instead closed for renovations. The theater's next production was the play Harvey, which opened in June 2012. This was followed in November by The Mystery of Edwin Drood, the theater's only production for the 2012–2013 season. Roundabout booked a revival of Cabaret for the 2013–2014 season, although the theater remained dark for a year. Cabaret opened in April 2014, initially for a 24-week engagement, but the show was so popular that it ran for a year. The play An Act of God opened at Studio 54 in May 2015, being the theater's only production during the 2014–2015 season.

The theater then returned to presenting two productions per season. Studio 54 hosted the play Thérèse Raquin and a revival of the musical She Loves Me during the 2015–2016 season, followed by the musical Holiday Inn and the play Sweat during the 2016–2017 season. Next, the theater hosted John Leguizamo's solo show Latin History for Morons and an American Sign Language revival of Children of a Lesser God in 2017–2018. The theater staged The Lifespan of a Fact and Kiss Me, Kate for the 2018–2019 season. Studio 54 hosted Adam Rapp's play The Sound Inside, which opened in October 2019. Studio 54 was supposed to host the musical Caroline, or Change during the 2019–2020 season. Due to the COVID-19 pandemic, Studio 54 closed on March 12, 2020, a day before previews of Caroline, or Change were supposed to start. That show's opening had originally been delayed to early 2021, but it was pushed further due to the extension of COVID-19 restrictions. 

Studio 54 reopened on October 8, 2021, with previews of Caroline, or Change, which officially opened later that month. This was followed in April 2022 by the play The Minutes. The Sharr White play Pictures from Home opened at Studio 54 in February 2023.

Notable productions 
Productions are listed by the year of their first performance.

Gallo Opera House/New Yorker Theatre 
 1927: Thirteen operas presented by the San Carlo Company
 1927: Electra
 1927: Juno and the Paycock
 1928: A Tailor-Made Man
 1930: Electra
 1931: Young Sinners
 1937: The Swing Mikado

Studio 54 (Roundabout) 

 1998: Cabaret
 2004: Assassins
 2004: Pacific Overtures
 2005: A Streetcar Named Desire
 2005: A Touch of the Poet
 2006: The Threepenny Opera
 2006: The Apple Tree
 2007: 110 in the Shade
 2007: The Ritz
 2008: Sunday in the Park with George
 2008: Pal Joey
 2009: Waiting for Godot
 2009: Wishful Drinking
 2010: Sondheim on Sondheim
 2010: Brief Encounter
 2011: The People in the Picture
 2012: Harvey
 2012: The Mystery of Edwin Drood
 2014: Cabaret
 2015: An Act of God
 2015: Thérèse Raquin
 2016: She Loves Me
 2016: Holiday Inn
 2017: Sweat
 2017: Latin History for Morons
 2018: Children of a Lesser God
 2018: The Lifespan of a Fact
 2019: Kiss Me, Kate
 2019: The Sound Inside
 2021: Caroline, or Change
 2022: The Minutes
 2023: Pictures from Home

Legacy 
By the late 1970s, the original nightclub had spurred the creation of Studio 54-themed jeans, a record label, an album, and a Japanese club. Architectural Digest magazine described Studio 54 as "the nightclub where the velvet rope was born", its impact evident long after the venue had been converted back to a theater. GQ magazine wrote in 2020: "When you want to designate a particular brand of louche elegance on a night-time scene, Studio 54 is the natural first port of comparative call."

Cultural impact 

The nightclub has been the subject of several works of popular media. The original Studio 54 was featured in the 1998 drama film 54. Studio 54, a 98-minute documentary by Matt Tyrnauer released in 2018, includes unpublished footage of the club and interviews with Ian Schrager. Additionally, the fourth season of the television series American Crime Story, announced in 2021, focuses on the club during the 1970s. Several books have also been written about the nightclub. The writer Anthony Haden-Guest published a book about Studio 54 and the disco subculture in 1997, and Mark Fleischman published his memoir Inside Studio 54 in October 2017. Schrager also published a book in 2018, Studio 54, with images of the club.

Studio 54 has also had an influence on disco music. Casablanca Records released a compilation album of disco music, A Night at Studio 54, in 1979; it peaked at No. 21 on the Billboard 200 album chart and sold close to a million copies. In 2011, Sirius XM launched Studio 54 Radio, a satellite radio station featuring classic disco and dance tracks from the 1970s to the 2000s. In 2020, it expanded into a music imprint including a record label, Studio 54 Music, which works with Sirius XM on Studio 54 Radio. The label's first release, Night Magic Vol. 1, is a four-track compilation EP of disco anthems from the club's prime days, revised by musicians from both the original scene and the modern dance music era. Studio 54 also inspired the name and overall concept of singer-songwriter Dua Lipa's 2020 concert series Studio 2054.

The club has been featured in several exhibitions. These include an exhibit of Studio 54 photographs, which Haden-Guest presented at the WhiteBox art gallery in 2015. as well a Brooklyn Museum exhibition entitled Night Magic, which premiered in 2020.  In addition, multiple Studio 54-themed collections from fashion and cosmetics brands, including Calvin Klein, Michael Kors and NARS Cosmetics, were released in 2019. The collections took inspiration from the club's glamorous heyday and showcased the iconic "54" logo.

Several venues have been likened to Studio 54. Fiorucci, an Italian fashion shop formerly located on East 59th Street, became known in the late 1970s as the "daytime Studio 54". The Mutiny Hotel in Miami, Florida, was described in a PBS NewsHour interview as "kind of the closest thing to Miami's Studio 54" in the late 1970s. The nightclub also inspired the creation of a Studio 54-themed nightclub at the MGM Grand Las Vegas hotel and casino in 1997; that club operated until 2012.

Memorabilia and preservation 
Before Rubell died in 1989, he saved "every single item" that he collected from the nightclub, such as the reservation book, invitation cards, and drink tickets. More than 400 of these items were sold at an auction in West Palm Beach, Florida, in January 2013, attracting hundreds of buyers. The auction yielded $316,680; the most expensive item was a $52,800 Andy Warhol sculpture.

The New York City Landmarks Preservation Commission (LPC) had started considering protecting Studio 54 as a landmark in 1982, with discussions continuing over the next several years. The LPC commenced a wide-ranging effort to grant landmark status to Broadway theaters in 1987, and the commission considered designating Studio 54's interior as a landmark. Ultimately, although the LPC protected 28 Broadway theaters as landmarks, Studio 54 was not one of them.

See also
 List of Broadway theaters

References

Notes

Citations

Sources

Further reading

External links

 
 

 
1927 establishments in New York City
Broadway theatres
CBS television studios
Cultural history of New York City
Defunct nightclubs in New York (state)
Midtown Manhattan
Nightclubs in Manhattan
Opera houses in New York City
Theatres completed in 1927